Mikael Gustafsson is a Finnish-born Swedish politician, who from 2011 until 2014, was a Member of the European Parliament, representing Sweden. He is a member of the Left Party

He served as Chair of the Committee on Women's Rights and Gender Equality from 2011 to 2014.

References

Living people
1966 births
MEPs for Sweden 2009–2014
Left Party (Sweden) MEPs